Arm is an unincorporated community in Lawrence County, Mississippi, United States.

History
When the Gulf and Ship Island Railroad was built through the area in 1905, the town of Arm was founded and named for W.J Armstrong who owned land near the railroad. A sawmill was built and a village developed, flourishing for a while until the mill was removed. In 1910, Arm had two sawmills, five general stores, and physician. By 1919, the community supported four sawmills. Since then, Arm became a farming center with one church and a store with a post office.

Notable people
 Earl W. Bascom, rodeo champion
 Texas Rose Bascom, rodeo trick rider

Notes

Unincorporated communities in Lawrence County, Mississippi
Unincorporated communities in Mississippi